The 1983 Valencian regional election was held on Sunday, 8 May 1983, to elect the 1st Corts of the Valencian Community. All 89 seats in the Corts were up for election. The election was held simultaneously with regional elections in twelve other autonomous communities and local elections all throughout Spain.

The Spanish Socialist Workers' Party (PSOE) won the election with an absolute majority of 51 out of 89 seats and almost 1 million votes (51.4% of the vote). The People's Coalition, composed in the Valencian Community by the People's Alliance (AP), the People's Democratic Party (PDP), the Liberal Union and the Valencian Union (UV), became the second political force and the main opposition party in the Corts Valencianes with 32 seats. The Communist Party of Spain (PCE) managed to surpass the 5% regional threshold and entered the Corts with 6 seats, seeing a slight recovery from its results in the October 1982 general election.

As a result of the election, regional PSOE leader Joan Lerma became the first democratically elected President of the Valencian Government.

Overview

Electoral system
The Corts Valencianes were the devolved, unicameral legislature of the Valencian autonomous community, having legislative power in regional matters as defined by the Spanish Constitution and the Valencian Statute of Autonomy, as well as the ability to vote confidence in or withdraw it from a President of the Government. Voting for the Corts was on the basis of universal suffrage, which comprised all nationals over 18 years of age, registered in the Valencian Community and in full enjoyment of their political rights.

The 89 members of the Corts Valencianes were elected using the D'Hondt method and a closed list proportional representation, with a threshold of 5 percent of valid votes—which included blank ballots—being applied regionally. Parties not reaching the threshold were not taken into consideration for seat distribution. Seats were allocated to constituencies, corresponding to the provinces of Alicante, Castellón and Valencia. Each constituency was allocated a fixed number of seats: 29 for Alicante, 25 for Castellón and 35 for Valencia.

The electoral law provided that parties, federations, coalitions and groupings of electors were allowed to present lists of candidates. However, groupings of electors were required to secure the signature of at least 0.1 percent of the electors registered in the constituency for which they sought election—needing to secure, in any case, the signature of 500 electors—. Electors were barred from signing for more than one list of candidates. Concurrently, parties and federations intending to enter in coalition to take part jointly at an election were required to inform the relevant Electoral Commission within fifteen days of the election being called.

Election date
The Council of the Valencian Country, in agreement with the Government of Spain, was required to call an election to the Corts Valencianes within from 1 February to 31 May 1983.

Opinion polls
The table below lists voting intention estimates in reverse chronological order, showing the most recent first and using the dates when the survey fieldwork was done, as opposed to the date of publication. Where the fieldwork dates are unknown, the date of publication is given instead. The highest percentage figure in each polling survey is displayed with its background shaded in the leading party's colour. If a tie ensues, this is applied to the figures with the highest percentages. The "Lead" column on the right shows the percentage-point difference between the parties with the highest percentages in a poll. When available, seat projections determined by the polling organisations are displayed below (or in place of) the percentages in a smaller font; 45 seats were required for an absolute majority in the Corts Valencianes.

Results

Overall

Distribution by constituency

Aftermath

References
Opinion poll sources

Other

1983 in the Valencian Community
Valencian Community
Regional elections in the Valencian Community
May 1983 events in Europe